Saqr Ghobash (born 1952) is an Emirati politician. He has been President of the Federal National Council since 2019. Previously he served as minister of labor and UAE ambassador to USA. 

He graduated from the Police Academy in Sudan in 1973, and he graduated from the UAE University in 1986 with a degree in Management.

He was a member of the Cosmos Club in Washington DC.

References

Living people
1952 births
Place of birth missing (living people)
Speakers of the Federal National Council
Government ministers of the United Arab Emirates
Ambassadors of the United Arab Emirates
Emirati politicians
United Arab Emirates University alumni